Xandro Schenk (born 28 April 1993) is a Dutch professional footballer who plays as a centre back for De Graafschap.

Club career

Ajax
Schenk joined the youth ranks of the Amsterdam club from FC Omniworld (now known as Almere City FC) in 2001, working his way up the youth ranks, he signed his first professional contract with Ajax in the summer of 2012, a two-year contract which bound him to the club until the summer of 2014. Starting his professional career in the reserve squad Jong Ajax, playing in the Beloften Eredivisie. Unable to break into the first team, Schenk was then subsequently loaned out to Go Ahead Eagles from Deventer during the Winter transfer window, playing in the Jupiler League, the second tier of professional football in the Netherlands for the remainder of the 2012–2013 season.

Go Ahead Eagles
In Deventer, Schenk played a good remainder of the season during his loan spell from Ajax. Making 15 appearances for his new club as a defender, Schenk helped his side to get promoted to the Eredivisie by the end of the season. He played his first match for Go Ahead Eagles on 1 February 2013 in a 1–0 loss at home against FC Den Bosch. Finishing the season sixth in the table, his team qualified for the Relegation/Promotion playoffs, where his side was able to secure promotion with Schenk playing in all six playoff encounters.

Following his successful stint with the Go Ahead Eagles, he was transferred to the club permanently from Ajax during the summer break on 14 June 2013, signing a two-year contract with the newly promoted club. He made his Eredivisie debut in the 1–1 draw against FC Utrecht on 4 August 2013 at the Stadion Galgenwaard. He scored his first goal six days later against ADO Den Haag on 10 August 2013 in a 2–1 win at home, scoring the opening goal in the 21st minute.

Twente
On 17 July 2018, Schenk signed with FC Twente on a two-year contract.

Vendsyssel FF
After a spell in Saudi Arabia, Schenk moved to Denmark, signing a deal until June 2023 with Danish 1st Division club Vendsyssel FF on 17 August 2021.

De Graafschap
After a season in Denmark, Schenk returned to his homeland: On 17 June 2022 De Graafschap confirmed, that Schenk har joined the club on a deal until June 2024.

Career statistics

Club

1 Includes UEFA Champions League and UEFA Europa League matches.

2 Includes Johan Cruijff Shield, and Eredivisie Playoffs matches.

References

External links
 

1993 births
Living people
Dutch footballers
Dutch expatriate footballers
Association football defenders
Footballers from Almere
Saudi Professional League players
AFC Ajax players
Go Ahead Eagles players
FC Twente players
Al Batin FC players
Vendsyssel FF players
De Graafschap players
Eredivisie players
Eerste Divisie players
Dutch expatriate sportspeople in Saudi Arabia
Dutch expatriate sportspeople in Denmark
Expatriate footballers in Saudi Arabia
Expatriate men's footballers in Denmark